Maksat Duysenbekuly Bayzhanov is a Kazakh professional footballer who plays as a midfielder for FC Kaisar.

Career
Bayzhanov is mostly known as former captain and leader of FC Kaisar.
In February 2015, Bayzhanov signed for FC Atyrau, before returning to FC Shakhter Karagandy in January 2016.

On 21 February 2020, FC Atyrau announced the return of Bayzhanov. He returned to FC Kaisar in March 2021.

Career statistics

Club

International

Statistics accurate as of match played 5 March 2014

International goals
Scores and results list Kazakhstan's goal tally first.

Honurs
Shakhter Karagandy
Kazakhstan Premier League (2): 2011, 2012

Interesting facts
His name translates from Kazakh as goal, target, purpose.

References

External links

Living people
1984 births
Kazakhstani footballers
Association football midfielders
Kazakhstan international footballers
Kazakhstan Premier League players
FC Irtysh Pavlodar players
FC Astana players
FC Atyrau players
FC Kaisar players
FC Aktobe players
FC Zhetysu players
FC Shakhter Karagandy players
People from Kyzylorda